Weekend Warrior is the fifth and final studio album by American hip hop musician Biz Markie. It was released on Tommy Boy Entertainment in 2003.

Track listing

References

External links
 

2003 albums
Biz Markie albums
Tommy Boy Records albums
Albums produced by the 45 King
Albums produced by J-Zone
Albums produced by Biz Markie